The following table lists which themed 'lands' are present in each of the Walt Disney Parks and Resorts around the world.

Key:

See also
 List of Disney theme park attractions

References

 
Lands at Disney theme parks
Lists of Disney attractions